Gao Style Baguazhang (高氏八卦掌) is the style of Baguazhang (八卦掌) descended from Gao Yisheng (高義盛), a student of Cheng Tinghua, who founded one of the two main branches of Baguazhang. Gao is alternatively said to have originally studied with Song Changrong (宋長榮) or Yin Fu (尹福), later (or alternatively previously) studying with one of Cheng's students, Zhou Yuxiang,(周玉祥). Gao style is one of the most widely practiced Baguazhang styles in the West; there are also many practitioners in Tianjin and Taiwan. It has many variations held within various lineages, some which are given below:

Dong Haichuan
Cheng Tinghua
Zhou Yuxiang
Gao Yisheng
Wu Jinyuan
Wu Huaishan
Wu Guozheng 
Liu Fengcai
Wang Shusheng
Liu Shuhang
Chen Baozhen   
Han Fangrui
He Kecai (Cantonese: Ho Ho Choi)
Cheung Sing Tang (C. S. Tang)
Zhang Junfeng
Hong Yixiang
Luo Dexiu

Su Dongchen
Hong Yiwen
Hong Yimien
Allen Pittman
Wu Mengxia
Wu Min'an
Bi Tianzuo 
Bi Motang
Bi Tianzuo

The Gao style system is referred to as the Gao Yisheng branch of the Cheng Tinghua system of Baguazhang. Essentially, Gao Style Bagua is a unique subsystem. The Gao style system, because of Gao's own martial progression over time, can be found to have a number of different permutations, represented in these various lingages. All are valid examples of Gao style Bagua because they all represent Gao Yisheng’s progression as a martial artist. Gao was refining and creating sets until he died. He changed his straight line, pre-heaven and weapons sets more than once in his life but at its core it is a complete Baguazhang system.

Gao style explicitly divides training into two categories: pre-heaven (先天) and post-heaven (後天).  Pre-heaven training includes walking the circle and practicing changing palms on the circle; this material is similar to that found in the other Cheng styles. Post-heaven training consists of 64 linear palms (六十四掌) is said by Gao Yisheng to be passed down by a man known as Song Yiren (宋益仁) (i.e., Song Yiren (送藝人), or "person who gives arts"); these palms are unique to the Gao system. 

Many Gao style practitioners can be found in Tianjin (lineage of Liu Fengcai and others), Taiwan (lineage of Zhang Junfeng), and Hong Kong (lineage of He Kecai).

References

External links 
Allen Pittman Gao Baguazhang, Xingyiquan, etc.
 Luo Dexiu - Gao Baguazhang in Taiwan
ZheZong School of Guanghua Gao Style Baguazhang  广华哲宗同易派 
Gao Baguazhang in Hong Kong

Baguazhang styles
Neijia